Olajumoke Orisaguna (born 1989) is a Nigerian model who received public attention when, while hawking bread on the streets of Lagos, she unknowingly walked into a photo shoot session of British rapper, Tinie Tempah, by Nigerian photographer, TY Bello, for Nigeria's This Day magazine. TY Bello, while making edits, found an image of Olajumoke and Tinie Tempah amongst the photos. Bello's searched for Olajumoke and photographed her. She appeared on the cover of the above magazine before she was employed as a model. She later got jobs in some major presenting shows and make up schools. The story was reported in various media sources, including CNN and BBC Africa.

Biography
Olajumoke Orisaguna was born in 1989 and brought up in Ire, Osun State. She trained as a hairdresser where she met an artisan named Sunday Orisaguna. They married in 2010 and later had two children. She is fluent in Yoruba.

Jumoke as she's fondly called, traveled to Lagos with one of her children where she hoped to make more money selling bread. Her husband stayed behind in Osun State with the other child where he installs sliding doors for a living. While she was working in Lagos, she was caught in the background of a picture taken by the photographer TY Bello while Bello was photographing the British rapper Tinie Tempah. While later reviewing and editing the images she had taken, Bello decided that Orisaguna had potential as a model. After posting on Instagram, Bello located Orisaguna and offered to launch her career. She arranged for Orisaguna's portrait to appear on the cover of Style magazine and planned to create a documentary about her.

Orisaguna was later offered a modelling contract with Few Model Management, internships and work, despite not being fluent in English. Following Orisaguna's success, her husband and other child moved to Lagos. In Nigeria, Orisaguna was praised in the media as a role model.

According to CNN, she will be offered some education and a bank has offered to pay for her children to attend school.

Olajumoke was awarded a scholarship by Sujimoto Group and Poise Nigeria. She will be learning Etiquette, Soft Skills, Social Graces and Communication at Poise Nigeria. The scholarship was initiated by Sujimoto Group who wanted to be sure that Olajumoke was equipped for life after the immediate attention dies down.

Controversy
In a YouTube video Olajumoke Sauce 7: Trends and Acceptance uploaded in February 2018, Orisaguna declared herself shocked by the fact that some people are gay and have the right to marry persons of the same sex.  Orisaguna declared homosexuality to be "un-Nigerian", and said in the Yoruba language, "I know that there is no Nigerian that was born as a gay or lesbian".  She also said that she found it difficult to sleep after she discovered on Facebook that some gay men and women plan to marry persons of the same sex. Orisaguna appeared to threaten LGBT people when she stated that they "will be dealt with in ways you can’t imagine".

In response, Nigerian transgender model Veso Golden Oke posted a video blasting the model, advising her to learn more about the LGBT community. Under Nigerian law based on British colonial jurisprudence, same-sex relationships between LGBT people remain a criminal offence, with maximum punishments ranging from 14 years imprisonment to the death penalty.

After her limelight to fame, her husband, Sunday Orisaguna, alleged that ever since she became a superstar, she has been disrespecting him and putting their marriage into disrepute. In response, she granted an  interview to The Punch saying her relationship is intact, and only God would judge between her husband and herself for the interview he has been granting about her.

References

1989 births
Living people
Nigerian female models
People from Osun State
Yoruba female models
Nigerian hairdressers
Models from Lagos